Country-wide local elections for seats in municipality and county councils were held throughout Norway in 1979. For most places this meant that two elections, the municipal elections and the county elections ran concurrently.

Results

Municipal elections
Results of the 1979 municipal elections.

County elections
Results of the 1979 county elections.

References

1979
1979
Norway
1979 in Norway